Diogo Malaquias da Silva (born October 15, 1988 in Rio de Janeiro, Brazil) is a Brazilian footballer.

Teams
  Tacuarembo 2009-2010
  Montevideo Wanderers 2011-2013

References
 
 
 Profile at Tenfield Digital 

1988 births
Living people
Brazilian footballers
Brazilian expatriate footballers
Tacuarembó F.C. players
Montevideo Wanderers F.C. players
Expatriate footballers in Uruguay
Association football defenders